Giscaro is a commune in the Gers department in southwestern France.

Geography 

The commune is bordered by four other communes: Gimont to the northwest, Maurens to the southwest, Frégouville to the southeast, and finally by Monferran-Savès to the east.

Population

See also
Communes of the Gers department

References

Communes of Gers